Sunakali is a 2015 documentary film directed by Bhojraj Bhat and produced by Good Neighbours Nepal. Sunakali is about a girls' football team that overcomes all obstacles to play football, finally attaining glory. It stars local girls from the Mugu district of remote Nepal which also lies in a mountainous region. 
Bhat's interest in the subject matter rose from this journalistic experience and an opportunity to highlight the aspects of the majority of Nepalese society that thwart their progress. Production began in early 2000 with Bhat covering the Maoist insurgency in remote areas of Nepal. 
Upon its release, Sunakali received tremendous acclaim and awards from all over the world. It has received awards like Best Documentary Diamond Award and has been officially selected at Kendal Mountain Film Festival. Fédération Internationale de Football Association (FIFA)'s official FIFA TV also featured a special report on Sunakali, titled "Meet the 'Himalayan Messi'" on August 21, 2016.)

Plot 
The documentary includes a number of girls from Mugu district who are not allowed to play football or wear half-pants (shorts). The girls explain their problems to the production team and express their desire to play football. They share their struggles of playing football at an altitude above 3500m and having to deal with parents. 
Sunakali is a girl from Mugu, a harsh district in the least developed region of Nepal, and she loves football. Together with her friend, they form Team Mugu, which goes on to win a tournament at the national level.

Screening 
Sunakali was screened as the World Premier and was the opening film of Kathmandu International Mountain Film Festival (KIMFF), 11–15 December 2014. To date Sunakali has received 16 international awards around the globe.

Awards

 Kathmandu International Mountain Film Festival (KIMFF), 11–15 December 2014. Award: Best ICIMOD Mountain Film Award, received USD $1000
 Kathmandu International Mountain Film Festival (KIMFF), 11–15 December 2014. Award: Best Documentary Jury Mention award
 International Premier: Mountain Film Festival Domzale, 23–27 February 2015. Award: Jury award in the nature and culture genre
 Canada Premier: 6th Annual Toronto Nepali Film Festival (TNFF), 28 March 2015. Award: Audience Choice Award, received USD $1000
 Pakistan International Mountain Film Festival (PIMFF), 13–14 June 2015. Award: Best Documentary Award
 Cinerockom International Film Festival, USA, 1–6 September 2015. Award: Best Documentary Diamond Award
 Berg Film Festival, Tegernsee, Germany, 21–25 October 2015. First Prize (€1,000) in the category of Mountain Life
 33rd Sport Movies & TV - Milano International FICTS Fest, Italy, 2015.  in the category of Movies & TV Football
 33rd BBVA Mountain Film Festival of Torelló, Spain, 2015. Best Film – Mountain Wilderness
 15th International Mountain Film Festival in Bansko, Bulgaria, 2015. The Award of the Municipality of Bansko
 Global Sport Media Pearl Awards, Abu Dhabi, UAE, 15 December 2015. 3rd-place award, received $5000 USD cash prize in the category of Documentary
 Bilbao Mendi Film Festival, 10–20 December 2015. Best Nature & Culture Film Award
 Mountain & Adventure Film Festival, USA, 2016. First runner-up, Cultural Award
 Thinking Football Film Festival, Spain, 2016. Best Documentary
 7th Football Film Festival, Brazil. Best Feature Documentary
 2016 New Zealand Mountain Film Festival. Special Jury Award

References 

2015 films
Nepalese documentary films
Documentary films about women's association football
Women's football in Nepal
Mugu District
2010s Nepali-language films
Documentary films about Nepal
2017 documentary films